Patrick Weil (born 14 October 1956 in Neuilly sur Seine) is a political scientist. He is a senior research fellow at CNRS, at the Centre for the social history of the 20th century at the University of Paris 1. His research focuses on comparative citizenship, immigration law and constitutional law.

He received his master's degree in public law from ESSEC business school before obtaining his doctorate in political science. He worked as cabinet logistical head of the Secretariat of State for immigrants in 1981 and 1982, and was a member of the Stasi Commission and of the board of the Cité Nationale de l’Histoire de l’Immigration (Museum of the History of Immigration) - a position which, with seven others, he resigned on 18 May 2007, in protest against the creation of a ministry of immigration and national identity by Nicolas Sarkozy.

He is president of the NGO Libraries Without Borders.

He is currently a visiting professor of law and Oscar M. Ruebhausen Distinguished Senior Fellow and senior research scholar at the Yale Law School.

Weil is the author of Le Sens de la République (Grasset 2016 with Nicolas Truong); The Sovereign Citizen: Denaturalization and the Origins of the American Republic (Univ of Penn Press, 2013); How to Be French: Nationality in the Making since 1789 (Duke Univ. Press 2008); Qu'est-ce qu'un Français? : Histoire de la nationalité française de la Révolution à nos jours (Grasset 2002)

In Le Monde, Weil says "Edward Snowden can ask the competent authorities for France’s protection "to obtain 
constitutional asylum, a specific French protection for "freedom fighters". "Firstly, the French office of refugees and stateless (OFPRA) who is in charge of all the demands for asylum, will have to study his application and make a decision. If this office reject Snowden’s application, the national court of asylum right and the French council of State would decide on its case in first and then last appeal" (Le Monde, June 5, 2014).

Other 
In 1992, he received the PhD prize of the National Assembly of France for his PhD work La France et ses étrangers.

References

External links 
 Patrick Weil's profile at the website of Yale Law School
 Patrick Weil's website

French civil servants
Living people
1956 births
French male non-fiction writers
21st-century French historians